Jim Creek is a stream in the U.S. state of South Dakota. Jim Creek derives its name from the James River, of which it is a tributary.

See also
List of rivers of South Dakota

References

Rivers of Miner County, South Dakota
Rivers of Sanborn County, South Dakota
Rivers of South Dakota